Edward Marshall Beatty Jr. (April 6, 1932 – June 7, 2008) was an American football center who played in the National Football League (NFL) for the Washington Redskins, the San Francisco 49ers, and the Pittsburgh Steelers. He played college football at the University of Mississippi and was drafted in the first round of the 1954 NFL Draft by the Los Angeles Rams. Beatty was born in Clarksdale, Mississippi, practiced dentistry after his playing days were over and died in Tiptonville, Tennessee where he lived.

References

1932 births
2008 deaths
American football centers
Ole Miss Rebels football players
Pittsburgh Steelers players
San Francisco 49ers players
Washington Redskins players
Sportspeople from Clarksdale, Mississippi
Players of American football from Mississippi
People from Clarksdale, Mississippi
People from Tiptonville, Tennessee